The Samsung Galaxy S LCD or Samsung Galaxy SL (GT-I9003) was an Android smartphone designed and manufactured by Samsung Electronics that was released in February 2011. It features a 1 GHz ARM Cortex-A8 processor, 4 GB of internal flash memory, a 4-inch (10 centimeters) 480x800 pixel WVGA Super Clear LCD capacitive touchscreen display, Wi-Fi connectivity, a 5-megapixel camera with a resolution of 2560x1920, and a front-facing 0.3 MP (640x480) VGA camera.

Hardware

Screen
The Samsung Galaxy SL has a  SuperClear LCD touch screen, protected by Gorilla Glass. The SC-LCD is cheaper than the AMOLED display used in Samsung Galaxy S. Furthermore, the display consumes more power compared to SuperAMOLED displays, although the phone ships with a higher capacity battery than the original Galaxy S to compensate for it. An advantage of the SuperClear LCD display over the SuperAMOLED one is that the latter uses a PenTile Matrix layout that some users find less visually appealing, while the former is a true RGB display.

Audio

The phone uses a different DAC compared to the original Samsung Galaxy S. It uses the Texas Instruments' TWL5030 which is integrated into the OMAP 3630 chipset.

Processor

The Samsung Galaxy SL uses the Texas Instruments OMAP 3630 SoC, which includes a 45 nm 1 GHz ARM Cortex-A8 based CPU core with 65 nm Imagination Technologies' PowerVR SGX 530 GPU which supports OpenGL ES 1.1/2.0.

Software
The phone was originally shipped with  Android 2.2 Froyo, with Samsung's own proprietary TouchWiz 3.0 user interface. Samsung started to rolled out updates in October 2011 for upgrading to Android 2.3 Gingerbread. Users are required to use Kies PC Suite for upgrading to Gingerbread. Samsung also announced that the upcoming "value pack" update is expected to bring performance improvements to the phone, including TouchWiz 4.0, face unlock, etc. to all of their legacy Galaxy line smartphones. As of mid-June 2012, the value pack has been available in several regions.

Along with default Android apps, a few extra apps are included, like Voice Memo, Mini Diary, ThinkFree Document viewer, and Layar augmented reality browser. Like many other Samsung Galaxy devices, the playback of DivX/Xvid videos is supported. Adobe Flash 11 plugin for Android is also present.

Android 4.X Support 

In July 2012, Samsung announced that an official update to Android 4.1.2 ''Jelly Bean'' will not be provided, as they felt that all Galaxy S line did not have enough RAM to run their own proprietary TouchWiz user interface on top of Android 4.1.2. However, developers such as the CyanogenMod team, based on Android Open Source Project source code. Unofficial support for Android 4.4 KitKat has been made available since November 2013.

Media Support

The phone comes with support for many multimedia file formats, including audio codecs (FLAC, WAV, Vorbis, MP3, AAC, AAC+, eAAC+, WMA, AMR-NB, AMR-WB, MID, AC3, XMF), video codecs (MPEG4, H.264, H.263, Sorenson codec, DivX HD/ XviD, VC-1) and video formats (3GP, MPEG-4, WMV, ASF, AVI, DivX, MKV, FLV).

See also
 Samsung Galaxy S series
 Galaxy Nexus
 Android
 List of Android devices

References

External links
Samsung Galaxy SL I9003 Official website
GSMArena Spec Sheet

Android (operating system) devices
Samsung smartphones
Samsung mobile phones
Samsung Galaxy
Mobile phones introduced in 2011
Discontinued smartphones